The 1993 Russian Figure Skating Championships took place in Chelyabinsk. Skaters competed in the disciplines of men's singles, ladies' singles, pair skating, and ice dancing. The results were one of the criteria used to pick the Russian teams to the 1993 World Championships and the 1993 European Championships.

Senior results

Men

Ladies

Pairs

Ice dancing

External links
 pairs on ice

Russian Figure Skating Championships, 1993
Russian Figure Skating Championships
1993 in Russian sport